The National Institutes of Health Division of Police (NIH DP) are the police force that police and protect National Institutes of Health (NIH) people and property.

Locations
The NIH in Bethesda, Maryland, consists of approximately 75 buildings that span over 300 acres of exclusive federal jurisdiction. 

The NIH Police are responsible for law enforcement services at the National Cancer Institute located in Fort Detrick, Maryland, and at the Rocky Mountain Laboratories in Hamilton, Montana. 

The NIH in Bethesda has the world's largest hospital dedicated to scientific research, its own power plant, water treatment plant, and Fire Department. NIH also contains the Vaccine Research Center and C.W. Bill Young Center for Biodefense and Emerging Infectious Diseases which houses BSL 3 and BSL 4 laboratories.

Structure
The NIH Police are an approximately 105-officer department which consists of Patrol Units, K9, Investigators, Intelligence Unit, Special Response Team, Training Division, Firearms Instructors, as well as Tactical Medical Officers.

Police and Security
The NIH DP has both a Police Department and a contracted security force, known as the Guard Force Operations Branch (GFOB), which provides physical security at gates at campuses. 

Security at the perimeter consists of:

Police Officers
Contracted Security Guards
Security Technicians.

Rank structure
The rank structure of the NIH Police is as follows:

Patrol Officer
Patrol Officer First Class
Corporal
Master Patrol Officer
Sergeant
Lieutenant
Captain
Major 
Deputy Chief
Chief.

Mission
It is the mission of the NIH Division of Police to protect the country's national treasure: scientific research, the NIH research community and to ensure that the mission of NIH is not impeded by personal attacks, loss of assets, criminal activity or acts of terrorism.

Equipment and uniform
NIH Police are armed federal officers and have a variety of equipment to do their jobs.

NIH Police wear a midnight navy shirt and outer armor carrier (Officers), white shirts and outer armor carrier (Sergeants and above), midnight navy patrol duty uniform pants, and black boots. K-9 officers wear blue BDU-style uniform and baseball cap.

NIH Police are equipped with a Sig Sauer P320 pistol, radio, handcuffs, flashlight, OC spray, baton and marked patrol vehicles fitted with lights and sirens. Issued long guns are the H&K 416D semi-auto and the H&K MP5 SD.

References

External links 
 Official website

National Institutes of Health
Agency-specific police departments of the United States
Federal law enforcement agencies of the United States